Cambronne may refer to:

People 
 Arnouph Deshayes de Cambronne (1768–1846), adjudant of the Château de Compiègne
 Claude de Cambronne (1905–1993), aircraft manufacturer
 Laurence de Cambronne (born 1951), French journalist and writer
 Luckner Cambronne (1930–2006), high-ranking political figure in François Duvalier's regime in Haiti
 Pierre Cambronne (1770–1842), general of the French Empire

Places
France
Cambronne (Paris Métro), elevated station of the Paris Métro
Cambronne-lès-Clermont, commune in the Oise department in northern France
Cambronne-lès-Ribécourt, commune in the Oise department in northern France